The Benjamin N. Cardozo School of Law is the law school of Yeshiva University. Located in New York City and founded in 1976, the school is named for Supreme Court Justice Benjamin N. Cardozo. Cardozo graduated its first class in 1979. An LL.M. program was established in 1998. Cardozo is nondenominational and has a secular curriculum, in contrast to some of YU's undergraduate programs. Around 320 students begin the J.D. program per year, of whom about 57% are women. In addition, there are about 60-70 LL.M. students each year. Cardozo is ranked 52nd in the nation by U.S. News & World Report 2023.

Academics

Centers 
Cardozo is home to academic centers including the FAME Center for fashion, arts, media & entertainment; the Innocence Project; the Florsheimer Center for Constitutional Democracy; the Data Law Initiative; the Blockchain Project; Cardozo/Google Patent Diversity Project; the Cardozo Law Institute in Holocaust and Human Rights; and the Heyman Center on Corporate Governance.

Faculty 
Cardozo's faculty are notably productive in their scholarship. They were ranked 15th most prolific faculty in 1996, when the School of Law was only twenty years old. Ten years later the faculty had the 31st most SSRN downloads, and it is ranked 33rd in scholarly impact (as of 2021). Highly cited faculty members include Professors Myriam Gilles, Michael Herz, Peter Markowitz, Alexander Reinert, Anthony Sebok, Stewart Sterk and Edward Zelinsky. Cardozo's faculty were also the most productive per capita for articles in top journals from 1993–2012, for law schools outside of U.S. News Top 50.

Clinical teaching
Cardozo is noted for its focus on clinical teaching and practical experience. As part of the fulfillment of the J.D. requirements, students may choose to participate in clinics housed within the school, taking on legal work under faculty supervision. The clinics provide pro bono services to clients across a range of areas of legal practice, including both civil and criminal cases. Many clinics serve individual clients, while other clinics take on class action lawsuits. They include the Tech Startup Clinic; Immigration Justice Clinic; the Innocence Project; Filmmakers Legal Clinic; Human Rights and Atrocity Prevention Clinic; the Civil Rights Clinic, Bet Tzedek (focused on representing elderly and disabled people seeking benefits, housing, etc.), and others. Perhaps the best known is the Innocence Project, run by Professor Barry Scheck, which has used DNA profiling to help free dozens of innocent people from prison. The project's work has been instrumental in a number of high-profile cases.

Rankings and achievements 
Cardozo has seven faculty members who have clerked for U.S. Supreme Court Justices, and Cardozo has had two graduates chosen to clerk for the U.S. Supreme Court: Sara J. Klein ’05 (for Justice John Paul Stevens) and Cliff Elgarten ’79 (for Justice William J. Brennan, Jr.). In 1999 Cardozo became a member of the Order of the Coif, an honor society for law scholars.  

Cardozo was the second U.S. law school to secure an invitation to The European Law Moot Court Competition, and the first American law school to be invited twice consecutively.  Many of Cardozo's 12,000 alumni reside in the New York metropolitan area, while many pursue their careers internationally and can be found across the country.

U.S. News ranked Cardozo 52nd out of 196 law schools in the country in 2022 (5th of 15 law schools in New York State). Cardozo's LL.M./Master of Laws program was ranked tenth by American Universities Admission Program in 2012. Cardozo ranked high in US News law specialties in Dispute Resolution (4th) and Intellectual Property Law (8th) as of the 2023 rankings. It has also been ranked in the top ten for its Music Law program. Cardozo got A-grades in several areas according to National Jurist's preLaw Magazine in 2018, including Tax Law, International Law, Alternative Dispute Resolution, and Business Law. PreLaw Magazine also ranked Cardozo highly in Government and Public Defender/Prosecutor specializations (11th).

Bar examination passage rates

In 2017, 85% of the law school's first-time test takers passed the bar exam. 94.81% of 2019 graduates who sat for the bar exam passed within two years of their date of graduation. Cardozo had the fifth highest New York State Bar Pass Rate among New York law schools in 2013. In 2019, 83% of the law school's first-time test takers passed the bar exam, placing the law school seventh-best among New York's 15 law schools.

Academic program 

Juris Doctor
For J.D. students, Cardozo offers a selection of over 240 courses in addition to the eight courses required during the first year.  Students may choose to graduate with a concentration in one, or several, of the following areas:

 Business Law
 Civil Litigation
 Corporate Compliance and Risk Control
 Criminal Justice
 Data Law
 Dispute Resolution
 Family and Children's Law
 Intellectual Property and Information Law
 International and Comparative Law
 Public Law, Regulation and Government Affairs
 Real Estate
 Rights and the State
 Tax Law

Clinical Education
Cardozo students may earn credits towards the J.D. through clinical education, mainly in-house pro bono work focused on public service and including civil litigation, criminal defense, divorce mediation, and a variety of other legal areas.

 Alexander Fellows Program
 Ferencz Human Rights and Atrocity Prevention Clinic
 Bet Tzedek Civil Litigation Clinic
 Civil Rights Clinic
 Criminal Defense Clinic
 Divorce Mediation Clinic
 Indie Film Clinic
 Innocence Project Clinic
 Greenberg Immigration Justice Clinic
 Mediation Clinic
 Prosecutor Practicum
 Securities Arbitration Clinic
 Tech Startup Clinic

Study abroad
Cardozo students may study abroad through the following programs:

 Amsterdam Law School: Amsterdam, The Netherlands
 Bucerius Law School:  Hamburg, Germany
 Central European University:  Budapest, Hungary
 Chinese University of Hong Kong: Hong Kong
 ESADE (Barcelona, Spain)
HEAD - L'ecode des Hautes Etudes Appliquees du Droit: Paris, France
 Peking University Law School
 Sorbonne Law School: Paris, France
 Tel Aviv University:  Tel Aviv, Israel
 University of Deusto: Bilbao, Spain
 University of Oxford Programme in Comparative Media Law and Policy: Oxford, England
 University of Paris X-Nanterre: Paris, France
 University of Roma Tre: Rome, Italy
 University of Sydney: Sydney, Australia
 Independent Study Abroad

May Entry
While most Cardozo students begin their legal studies in August, some students begin in May.  May-entry students take their first-year courses over three semesters - summer, fall, and spring, and then attend their fall and spring first-year classes with fall-entry students.

Master of Laws
For those who already have a law degree, Cardozo offers LL.M. degrees in General Studies, Comparative Legal Thought, Dispute Resolution and Advocacy, and Intellectual Property. LL.M. students can take almost any of the courses offered to J.D. students. The LL.M. program may be entered in the Spring Term or in the Fall Term.

Post-graduation employment and costs  
According to Cardozo's ABA-required disclosures, 81% of the Class of 2021 obtained full-time, long-term, bar passage-required employment within ten months of graduating. Of the Class of 2018, 87% obtained full-time, long-term, JD-required or JD-advantage employment within ten months. The law school ranks 25th in the United States for "Gold Standard" jobs (full-time, long-term jobs requiring bar passage that are not funded by the school). It is 37th in the percentage of graduates hired by the 100 largest firms. 

The total cost of attendance (indicating the cost of tuition, fees, and living expenses) at Cardozo for the 2017–2018 academic year was $86,670. The Law School Transparency estimated non-discounted, debt-financed cost of attendance for three years is $323,858.

Location and facilities 

Located on lower Fifth Avenue at the corner of 12th Street in New York City's Greenwich Village, Cardozo's urban campus is in a 19-story building, known as the Brookdale Center. A multimillion-dollar capital improvement plan took place in 2006. The addition of more space at the Brookdale Center also allowed for a larger and significantly enhanced library, new offices and clinic spaces, as well as a new and larger lobby, moot court room, and ground-floor seminar room. In addition, older classrooms were renovated. In fall 2006, the Greenberg Center for Student Life, given in honor of former Dean David Rudenstine, opened. This addition to Cardozo included a new student lounge and a cafe on the third floor. Also completed were several new seminar rooms, internal stairways between floors, and added windows.

The Dr. Lillian and Dr. Rebecca Chutick Law Library is the center of student and faculty research at Cardozo. Encompassing four floors of Cardozo's building, the library holds more than 535,000 volumes, over 140 computers, and study space for about 500 students. 

Brookdale Center – 55 Fifth Avenue
Cardozo's main campus.

The Innocence Project – 40 Worth St
The Innocence Project moved from the 11th floor of Brookdale Center to a new office space. The move allowed the Innocence Project to hire more staff and significantly increase the number of cases it takes.

Fogelman Library of The New School – 65 Fifth Avenue

The Cooper Union Library – 7 East 7th Street
Both the Fogelman Library and the Cooper Union library serve as Cardozo's secondary libraries when the main library is closed on the Sabbath or on holidays.

Student activities

Law journals
Students in the JD program publish several law journals: Cardozo Law Review; Cardozo Arts & Entertainment Law Journal; Cardozo International and Comparative Law Review; Cardozo Journal of Conflict Resolution; and Cardozo Journal of Equal Rights and Social Justice.

Cardozo Law Review was established in 1979, the first year of the School of Law's existence. The journal was cited 75 times in court cases in 2017-21, making it fourth most-cited among American law journals (after Harvard Law Review, California Law Review and Yale Law Review). By journal citations, it ranks 29th, according to Washington & Lee Law School's database. Cardozo Arts & Entertainment Law Journal was ranked first in journal cites in the Entertainment, Arts and Sports Law category in 2006 (second in Scholarly Impact and third in Cites by Courts).

Moot courts
Cardozo offers students the opportunity to participate in the Moot Court Honor Society, a competition-based organization at the school. In addition to participating in approximately six competitions each semester, the organization also hosts the Paulsen Intramural Moot Court Competition, the Monroe Price Media Law Competition, the Cardozo/BMI Moot Court Competition, and the Langfan Oratorical Competition.

LGBTQ+ student group

Although Cardozo is under the umbrella of Yeshiva University, which has been involved in legal proceedings after refusing to recognize an undergraduate Pride Alliance group for LGBTQ+ students and allies, Cardozo has long had an active, officially recognized LGBTQ student groups; the Gay and Lesbian Alliance was active on campus by the early 1990s, and presently has a student group, OUTLaw, which has put out statements opposing YU's discrimination against its LGBTQ undergraduates. 

Faculty and students at both Cardozo and YU's Ferkauf Graduate School of Psychology have voiced their disapproval of the University's discrimination and lawsuit. In a letter signed by over 50 members of the Cardozo faculty (which has 56 full-time members), and in statements made by the Dean of the Law School and the Cardozo Board of Overseers, the Law School has publicly affirmed support for LGBTQIA+ rights and called on YU's administration to desist from its appeal and end its discrimination policy.

Notable people

Deans of the Law School
 Monrad G. Paulsen (1976-82)
 Lester Brickman (1980-82, Acting Dean)
 Monroe E. Price (1982-91)
 Frank J. Macchiarola (1991-96) 
 Paul R. Verkuil (1997-2001)
 David Rudenstine (2001-09)
 Matthew Diller (c. 2009-15) 
 Melanie Leslie (2015-present)

Alumni 
 
 Geoffrey Bowers (1954–87), plaintiff in one of the first AIDS discrimination cases to go to public hearing
 Madeleine Cosman, medieval expert and conservative policy commentator
 Lawrence A. Cunningham, Professor of Law at George Washington University
 John Dalli, partner at Dalli & Marino, LLP
 Ed Fagan, disgraced reparations lawyer
 Sandra J. Feuerstein, District Court Judge, Eastern District of New York
 Sonia Gardner, hedge fund manager and co-founder of Avenue Capital Group
 John S. Hall, poet, musician and entertainment lawyer
 Eric Herschmann served as a senior advisor to former President Donald Trump.
 Anna Kaplan, New York State Senator for the 7th State Senate district
 Rachel Hirschfeld, animal rights activist and lawyer
 Eddie Huang, Taiwanese American restaurateur, actor, and clothing designer
 Jeff Marx, composer and Tony-award winning musical lyricist
 Scott McCoy, former member of the Utah State Senate
 Grace Meng, U.S. Congresswoman for New York's 6th Congressional District
 Barbara Olson, lawyer, conservative television commentator (killed in 9/11)
 Juliette Passer, president & General Counsel at PanaManagement Corporation
 Nathan A. Paul, Vice Chair & Chief Operating Officer at Lazard Asset Management
 Federico Andino Reynal, defended Alex Jones in the Sandy Hook defamation trials
 David Samson, president of the Miami Marlins
 Josh Saviano, actor who played Paul Pfeiffer in The Wonder Years.
 Christopher A. Seeger, mass tort and class action litigator
 Pam Sherman, columnist also known as "The Suburban Outlaw"
 Marc H. Simon, filmmaker and entertainment attorney
 Laura Sydell, NPR journalist on Digital Culture
 Randi Weingarten, President of the American Federation of Teachers
 Aaron L. Weisman, United States Attorney for the District of Rhode Island
 Ivan Wilzig, techno musician also known as "Sir Ivan"
  Aviva Drescher, television personality.

Notable faculty 
Current faculty

 J. David Bleich
 Myriam Gilles
 Peter Goodrich
 Deborah Pearlstein
 Alexander A. Reinert
 Michel Rosenfeld
 Jessica Roth
 David Rudenstine
 Barry Scheck
 Kate Shaw
 Stewart Sterk
 Richard H. Weisberg
 Edward Zelinsky

Former faculty

 Michelle Adams  — University of Michigan School of Law
 Susan Crawford — Harvard Law School
 John F. Duffy —  UVA Law School
 Marci Hamilton
 Justin Hughes
 John McGinnis — Northwestern University School of Law
 William F. Patry
 Scott J. Shapiro — Yale Law School
 Telford Taylor
 Ekow Yankah — University of Michigan School of Law

See also 
 Legal education in the United States
 Law schools in the United States
 Law of New York
 Juris doctor

References 
Notes

External links 

 

Cardozo School of Law
Cardozo School of Law
Cardozo School of Law
Educational institutions established in 1976
1976 establishments in New York City
Wrongful conviction advocacy